In mathematics, the H-derivative is a notion of derivative in the study of abstract Wiener spaces and the Malliavin calculus.

Definition

Let  be an abstract Wiener space, and suppose that  is differentiable. Then the Fréchet derivative is a map
;

,

Define the -gradient  by
.

See also

 Malliavin derivative

References

Generalizations of the derivative
Measure theory
Stochastic calculus